Annual cicadas are North American Cicadidae species that appear every summer. The life cycle of a so-called annual cicada typically spans 2 to 5 years; they are "annual" only in the sense that members of the species reappear annually. The name is used to distinguish them from periodical cicada species, which occur only in Eastern North America, are developmentally synchronized, and appear in great swarms every 13 or 17 years. All other cicadas from all other biogeographic regions produce annual broods, so the distinction is not made outside of North America.

Species called "annual cicada" include members of the genus Neotibicen ("dog-day cicadas"), Diceroprocta, Neocicada, and Okanagana.

References

Cicadas